Kept and Dreamless (Las Mantenidas Sin Sueños) is a 2005 Argentinian film directed by and starring Vera Fogwill. It also features Lucia Snieg and Elsa Berenguer. Shown at the American Film Institute's Silver Theatre in Silver Spring, Maryland, on September 24, 2005, this post-modern film explores mother-daughter relationships and the struggles of a 10-year-old child to raise her cocaine-addicted mother. The film is reminiscent of the work of Spanish director Pedro Sanchez.

References

External links

 

2005 films
2005 drama films
Argentine drama films
2000s Argentine films